Diego Dionisio Luna Alexander (born 29 December 1979) is a Mexican actor, director, and producer. He is known for his portrayal of Cassian Andor in Rogue One: A Star Wars Story and the Disney+ series Andor.

Following an early career in Mexican telenovelas, he had his breakthrough in the critically acclaimed 2001 film Y tu mamá también. During the 2000s, he appeared in both Mexican and American films including Frida, Open Range, Dirty Dancing: Havana Nights, The Terminal, Criminal, Milk, Sólo quiero caminar, and Rudo y Cursi. In the 2010s, he co-starred in a variety of films like the sci-fi Elysium, comedy Casa de mi Padre, and the animated musical The Book of Life, before starring as Andor in 2016's Rogue One, a role he reprises in the 2022 Disney+ series of the same name. From 2018 to 2020, he starred as the drug trafficker Miguel Ángel Félix Gallardo in Narcos: Mexico.

Throughout his career, he has appeared in Mexican theater productions and produced a number of film and television projects, many with his close collaborator Gael García Bernal. Since 2010, he has directed three feature films: Abel, Cesar Chavez, and Mr. Pig. He is the creator and director of the 2013 Fusion TV docu-series Back Home, his Amazon Studios talk show Pan y Circo, which premiered in 2020, and the 2021 Netflix scripted series .

Early life
Luna was born in Toluca and raised in Mexico City. His mother, Fiona Alexander, was a British costume designer of Scottish and English descent. She died in a car accident when Luna was two years old. His father, Alejandro Luna, was a theater, film, and opera set designer.  He has an older sister. Luna and his frequent co-star Gael García Bernal have been friends from infancy. Their mothers were friends.

Career

Acting 
Luna acted in his first play at age seven. As a child actor, he appeared in several telenovelas and films. In 1992, he had arcs on Televisa's El abuelo y yo and Ángeles sin paraíso. As a teenager, Luna was part of the main casts of El premio mayor (1995–1996) and La vida en el espejo (1999–2000), playing the main characters' son; he also starred in the films Un hilito de sangre (A Trickle of Blood; 1995), El cometa (The Comet; 1999), and Un dulce olor a muerte (A Sweet Scent of Death; 1995), all which made him a teen star. He had small roles in the films Todo el poder (Gimme the Power; 2000) and Before Night Falls (2000), Luna's first international film.

Luna starred as Tenoch Iturbide alongside Gael García Bernal in Y tu mamá también (2001), a Mexican road trip film directed by Alfonso Cuarón. A critical and box office success, the role brought him international stardom. The film was the beginning series of high-profile collaborations with childhood friend García Bernal, with whom he would costar in several films and go on to establish Canana Films. For these roles and others, the two are considered to be faces of the Nuevo Cine Mexicano film movement.

In the following two years, Luna acted in Mexican films along with English-language productions like the miniseries Fidel, Vampires: Los Muertos, the Kevin Costner western Open Range, and the Academy Award-winning Frida. He starred in the 2003 film Nicotina, which was critically and commercially successful in Mexico. 2004 was a significant year for Luna as he starred in Steven Spielberg's The Terminal alongside Tom Hanks, the Dirty Dancing: Havana Nights (a Cuban-based reimagining of Dirty Dancing), and the indie crime film Criminal opposite John C. Reilly. He subsequently had starring roles in the films Fade to Black (2006) and Harmony Korine's Mister Lonely (2007), and also appeared in the critically acclaimed biopic Milk (2008). In Spanish-language film, he starred in Sólo Dios sabe opposite Alice Braga (Only God Knows; 2006), crime thriller Solo quiero caminar (Walking Vengeance; 2008)—for which he was nominated for a Goya Award—and the soccer comedy Rudo y Cursi (2008), one of the highest grossing Mexican films of all time.

In the early 2010s, Luna co-starred in the Will Ferrell Spanish-language comedy Casa de mi Padre (2012) and appeared in the action films Contraband and Elysium. He appeared opposite Katy Perry in her music video for "The One That Got Away;" as of 2022, the music video has nearly 1 billion views on YouTube. He starred in the animated musical comedy The Book of Life (2014) whose soundtrack charted in numerous countries. In 2015, the pilot episode of the Amazon Studios series Casanova, in which Luna stars as Giacomo Casanova. The show was not picked up to series.

In August 2015, it was announced that Luna was part of the cast of what was then known as Star Wars: Rogue One. Rogue One: A Star Wars Story premiered in 2016, and his portrayal of Cassian Andor, a captain and intelligence officer of the Rebel Alliance, brought him international attention. He reprised the role in Andor (2022–present), the Disney+ series centered around the character. The show was originally announced in 2018 but production was delayed until November 2020 by the development process and the COVID-19 pandemic. A second and final season began production in Fall 2022 and is expected to wrap in August 2023; the season will be released in 2024. Luna is an executive producer of the series.

In 2017, it was announced that he would star in a Scarface remake; however, the film went through multiple rewrites and directorial changes in the following years, losing Luna as the lead in the process.

Luna starred as Mexican drug cartel leader Miguel Ángel Félix Gallardo in the Netflix series Narcos: Mexico, which premiered in November 2018. He appeared in the first two seasons of the show. Film roles around this time included ensemble roles in the auteur films If Beale Street Could Talk (2018) and A Rainy Day in New York (2019), and a starring role in the 2020 indie drama Wander Darkly. Luna had a number of voice acting roles in children's animation, including the 2022 box office hit DC League of Super-Pets; notably, he is part of every installment of Guillermo del Toro's Tales of Arcadia television franchise: Trollhunters (2016), 3Below (2018), Wizards (2020) and the film Trollhunters: Rise of the Titans (2021).

Producing and directing 
With frequent collaborator Gael García Bernal and producer Pablo Cruz, Luna created the production company Canana Films in 2005. Together, they have produced dozens of Mexican film and television productions. Notably, they executive produced the 2009 Cary Fukunaga film Sin nombre, which was honored by the Sundance Film Festival and Independent Spirit Awards, the 2011 thriller Miss Bala which was submitted as Mexico’s foreign-language Oscar submission, and the 2015 drama The Chosen Ones. In 2015, Luna and Cruz launched the branded entertainment studio Gloria for Latin American talent.

Luna and García Bernal departed Canana in 2018, subsequently founding a new production company, La Corriente del Golfo. In October 2019, it was announced that Luna and García Bernal were joining the Creative Advisory Board for the TV and film development company EXILE Content. In 2020, they signed a first-look deal with Amazon Studios.

In 2007, Luna directed his first film, a documentary about Mexican boxer Julio César Chávez. His first feature film, the dramedy Abel, premiered at the 2010 Sundance Film Festival and received positive reviews. 

In 2012, Luna directed the biopic Cesar Chávez; the film starred Michael Peña as Cesar Chávez, the founder of the United Farm Workers, America Ferrera, and Rosario Dawson. The film premiered at the 64th Berlin International Film Festival and was awarded an Audience Award for Narrative Feature at the 2014 SXSW Film Festival. The film received mixed reviews. The following year, he created and directed the docu-series Back Home, which follows celebrity guests on a journey to their family homelands. The show was broadcast on Fusion TV. 

His next feature film was Mr. Pig, also known as Sr. Pig, which premiered at the 2016 Sundance Film Festival. The film stars Danny Glover and Maya Rudolph whose characters travel on a road trip through Mexico. 

It was announced in 2019 that Luna and García Bernal would executive produce an epic miniseries Cortes for Amazon starring Javier Bardem as conquistador Hernán Cortés, then described as "the largest Spanish-language production of all time." Two weeks into production in 2020, the production was canceled due to the COVID-19 pandemic. 

In 2020, Luna created the Amazon Prime Video talk show Pan y Circo, which he produced, directed, and hosts; the following year, he received a Daytime Emmy Award for Outstanding Daytime Talent in a Spanish Language Program. He created his first scripted television series, the satirical drama , which was released on Netflix in 2021. Luna is also an executive producer of his series Andor which premiered in 2022.

Other work 
Luna, García Bernal, and Elena Fortes co-founded Ambulante, also known as the Ambulante Documentary Film Festival, an organization and film festival whose mission is for documentary films to be used as tools for transformation. The organization received the prestigious Washington Office on Latin America's Human Rights Award in 2011. In January 2015, Luna narrated a video of theirs about the obstacles faced by children migrating from their home countries and seeking refuge in the U.S.

Luna was a repeat host of the 2000s-era MTV Video Music Awards Latinoamérica, hosting in 2002, 2003, and 2007; he presented an award at the 2006 ceremony. In 2004, he co-hosted the 18th Goya Awards with Cayetana Guillén Cuervo. He has also presented at the 2005 MTV Europe Music Awards, Premio Lo Nuestro 2014, 2014 MTV Fandom Awards, 74th Golden Globe Awards, 2018 MTV Europe Music Awards, 91st Academy Awards, and 74th Primetime Emmy Awards. 

Luna was a jury member at the 2008 Sundance Film Festival. He was a member of the 2016 jury for the Un Certain Regard section of the Cannes Film Festival. In 2017, he was part of the International Jury at the 67th Berlin International Film Festival.

Personal life
Luna married Camila Sodi in February 2008; they divorced in March 2013. They have two children: Jerónimo (b. August 12, 2008), and Fiona (b. July 1, 2010), named after Luna's mother. Luna has resided in Los Angeles. Since 2017, he and his family have lived in Mexico City.

Filmography

Film

Television

Theater 
Selected credits

 El Cantaro Roto (1996) 
 Festen (2006–2007) – Teatro Helénico
 The Good Canary / El buen canario (2008–2009) – Teatro de los Insurgentes
 Howl (2012) – Teatro Helénico
 Cada vez nos despedimos mejor (2013, 2014) – Teatro de la Sala Chopin
 Privacy (2017–2018) – Teatro de los Insurgentes
 Cada vez nos despedimos mejor (2022) – Las Naves del Español, Madrid

Music videos

Awards

References

External links

1979 births
20th-century Mexican male actors
21st-century Mexican male actors
Hispanic and Latino American male actors
Living people
Male actors from Mexico City
Mexican film directors
Mexican film producers
Mexican male child actors
Mexican male film actors
Mexican male telenovela actors
Mexican male voice actors
Mexican people of English descent
Mexican people of Scottish descent
Mexican people of British descent
Mexican television producers
Daytime Emmy Award winners
Marcello Mastroianni Award winners
People from Toluca